Jitsuzo Hinago (24 October 1892 – 25 April 1945) was a Japanese sculptor. His work was part of the art competitions at the 1932 Summer Olympics and the 1936 Summer Olympics.

References

1892 births
1945 deaths
20th-century Japanese sculptors
Japanese sculptors
Olympic competitors in art competitions
People from Ōita Prefecture